Vardges Ulubabyan is a Deputy to Nagorno-Karabakh legislature.
He is also the director of the Nagorno-Karabakh State Archives.
In September 2011 he led a diplomatic mission to Transnistria.

References

1968 births
Living people
Politicians from the Republic of Artsakh